Between Yesterday and Tomorrow is a 1947 German drama film directed by Harald Braun and starring Hildegard Knef, Winnie Markus and Sybille Schmitz.

Plot
In post-war Germany a group of former guests return to a luxurious Munich hotel where they are haunted by memories of their past interaction with Nelly Dreifuss, a Jewish woman who had died during the Nazi era. It was part of both the cycle of rubble films and subgenre of hotel films. As with many other German rubble films, it examines issues of collective guilt and future rebuilding.

It was shot at the Bavaria Studios in Munich. The film's sets were designed by the art director Robert Herlth.

Cast

References

Bibliography

External links
 

1947 films
1947 drama films
German drama films
West German films
1940s German-language films
Films directed by Harald Braun
Films about Nazi Germany
Films set in Munich
Films set in hotels
German black-and-white films
Bavaria Film films
Films shot at Bavaria Studios
1940s German films